Seaborough Hill is a prominent ridge,  high, on the Dorset-Somerset border in the Yeovil Scarplands in southwestern England.

Seaborough Hill rises immediately north of the village of Seaborough and about 3 kilometres southwest of the town centre of Crewkerne. A minor road traverses the summit from north to south and there is a trig point (201 m) by the lane at the northern end of the summit ridge, near Honeydown Farm. There are scattered woods on the western and eastern flanks of the hill. The River Axe runs past the hill to the south and two major trails - Liberty Trail and Monarch's Way bypass it to the north and south respectively. The county boundary runs along the ridgeline before swinging around the northern spur of the hill and heading away to the southeast.

References 

Hills of Dorset